Somatina apicipuncta is a moth of the  family Geometridae. It is found in Ghana.

References

Endemic fauna of Ghana
Moths described in 1915
Scopulini
Insects of West Africa
Moths of Africa